Jawali is a small village located in the Mahadeva Mountain range of Phaltan Tehsil of the Satara district of the Indian state of Maharashtra.

History 

The area was ruled by the Morè clan. The clan claims descent from the Somavanshi king Morè of the Kashmir Region. Some Morè also claims descent from the Mauryan Dynasty of Patana (Bihar) which ruled over the Maurya Empire, located in present day India. The Maurya Empire, and many Morè, boast of rulers like Chandragupta Maurya and Ashoka. In Pre-Chatrapati Shivaji Maharaj era, Morè were feudatory of Vijaynagar empire along with other highest maratha clans like Bhoite, Kadam, Salunkhe, Shinde who were under Sultanates of Deccan. Later, when they opposed King Shivaji's Maharaj  Swarajya Kingdom, they were punished. After that, many more joined the Maratha cavalry of Shivaji and remained active and trusted lieutenants of Maratha Empire.

The Battle of Salher was fought between the Marathas and the Mughals at nearby Salher fort in 1672.

After the death of Sambhaji, the Maratha Kingdom was put into disarray. On 26 December 1697, Sardar Manajirao More along with Mansingh More, Krushnajirao More, Prataprao More helped Rajaram I reach Arni fort which was located 30 miles away. Rajaram eventually became the Chhatrapati.

During the British Raj, Jawali was under the Phaltan Princely State ruled by Royal Naik Nimbalkar.

Transport 
MSRTC Buses from Phaltan Depot run regularly to Jawali, Aandrood to Shikhar-Shinganapur.

Occupation 
The main occupation of the villagers in Jawali is in the field of agriculture and the biggest market center is in Phaltan.

Education 
Phaltan is the nearest education centre. The village has one high school.

See also 
 Mane (clan)
 Bhoite
 Nimbalkar
 More

References 
 Village Panchayat
 

Villages in Satara district